Anatoly Gennadyevich Iksanov (February 18, 1952) was the General Director of the Bolshoi Theatre of Russia between 2000 and July 2013. His successor was Vladimir Urin.

In 1977, he graduated with a degree in theatre from the Leningrad Institute of Theatre, Music and Cinematography. A year after graduating from the Institute he worked as the chief administrator of the Maly Theatre in Moscow. From 1996 to 1998, he was Director of the Tovstonogov Bolshoi Drama Theater.

Ten years after becoming General Director of the Bolshoi Theatre, he participated in the Theatre's official presentation after its reconstruction.
In 2012 he was awarded the Order of Merit of the Italian Republic and the Legion of Honour.

References 

Living people
Russian theatre directors
Bolshoi Theatre directors
Russian theatre critics
1952 births
Recipients of the Order of Merit of the Italian Republic
Recipients of the Order of Honour (Russia)
Chevaliers of the Légion d'honneur
Soviet theatre critics